Le Transbordeur is a 1,800-seat concert hall located in Villeurbanne, France. It was inaugurated in 1989.

Notable past performers include Lorde, Tool, Blue Öyster Cult, Robert Plant, Megadeth, Motörhead, Porcupine Tree, Lenny Kravitz, Simple Minds (2010), Nick Cave & The Bad Seeds (2011), Boy George (2014) and Mogwai (2022).

References

External links
Official Website

Concert halls in France
Villeurbanne
Buildings and structures in Lyon Metropolis